Kalle Utter is a 1925 Swedish silent historical drama film directed by Karin Swanström and starring Anders de Wahl, Georg Blomstedt and John Ekman.

Cast
 Anders de Wahl as Kalle Utter
 Georg Blomstedt as Kalle's Father
 John Ekman as 	Baron Cedercreutz
 Nils Aréhn as 	Count Stjerncrona
 Karin Swanström as Countess Stjerncrona
 Edit Rolf as 	Marianne
 Carl Browallius as 	Professor
 Julia Cæsar as 	Guest
 Linnéa Hillberg as 	Ingeborg
 Gull Natorp as Prostinna
 Olav Riégo as Head Waiter

References

Bibliography
 Gustafsson, Tommy. Masculinity in the Golden Age of Swedish Cinema: A Cultural Analysis of 1920s Films. McFarland, 2014.
 Qvist, Per Olov & von Bagh, Peter. Guide to the Cinema of Sweden and Finland. Greenwood Publishing Group, 2000.
 Wredlund, Bertil. Långfilm i Sverige: 1920-1929. Proprius, 1987.

External links

1925 films
1925 drama films
Swedish silent feature films
Swedish black-and-white films
Films directed by Karin Swanström
1920s Swedish-language films
Films set in the 19th century
1920s historical drama films
Swedish historical drama films
Silent historical drama films
1920s Swedish films